Pisidium subtruncatum is a species of pill clam, a minute freshwater bivalve in the family Sphaeriidae.

Description
The 2.7 – 4 mm shell is moderately tumid (swollen). In shape it is a strongly oblique oval. The umbos are prominent and well behind the middle. The surface is silky glossy with fine, irregular ribbing. In colour it is whitish to greyish.

Distribution
Its native distribution is Holarctic.

 Czech Republic – in Bohemia, in Moravia, least concern (LC)
 Germany – distributed in whole Germany but in 2 states in red list (Rote Liste BRD).
 Nordic countries: Denmark, Faroes, Finland, Iceland, Norway and Sweden
Great Britain and Ireland

References

External links
Pisidium subtruncatum at Animalbase taxonomy,short description, biology,status (threats), images
Images at BOLD.
Pisidium subtruncatum illustrated in Danmarks Fauna (Georg Mandahl-Barth)

subtruncatum
Bivalves described in 1855